Scott Waara (born June 5, 1957) is an American actor. He made his Broadway debut as a member of the ensemble for the musical Wind in the Willows, and performed in Welcome to the Club and City of Angels. He won the Best Featured Actor Tony Award for his performance of Herman in The Most Happy Fella in 1992.

Career 
Waara played Duane Cooper in the short-lived 1994 CBS sitcom Muddling Through. He portrayed B. Santa Maria in the 2004 Award-Winning short film The Proverb. He has continued starring in TV shows like Numb3rs, CSI: Miami, and Without a Trace. In addition, Waara starred in the 2009 film The Least Among You with Lauren Holly and Louis Gossett Jr. In 2015, Waara portrayed Da in the national touring company of Once.

Filmography

Film

Television

References

External links
 
 

1957 births
Drama Desk Award winners
Tony Award winners
American male musical theatre actors
Living people
Male actors from Chicago

Southern Methodist University alumni